Nebulosa fulvipalpis is a moth of the  family Notodontidae. It is found on mid elevations on the western slope of the Andes, from Cali, Colombia, south to Pichincha, Ecuador.

References
  2009: Generic revision of the Dioptinae (Lepidoptera: Noctuoidea: Notodontidae) Part 1: Dioptini. Bulletin of the American Museum of Natural History, 321: 1-674.

Moths described in 1910
Notodontidae of South America